Barnet Joseph Segal (January 29, 1898– September 6, 1985) was an American businessman and early investor and banker in Carmel-by-the-Sea, California. He helped start several financial institutions, including the Bank of Carmel and the Carmel Savings and Loan Association. He was "historically Carmel's most significant financier." Segal setup the Barnet J. Segal Charitable Trust to distribute his estate for the benefit of Monterey County, California.

Early life 

Barnet "Barney" Segal was born on January 29, 1898, in New York City, New York. His father was Joseph Segal, and mother was Jennie Weiss. He spent time in an orphanage because his mother died of tuberculosis when he was two years old. He was raised and educated in New Jersey. He attended and graduated from the Bayonne High School in New Jersey and was a student at New York University and then the Pace Business College of New York City, pursuing an accounting degree. He joined the infantry during World War I in New York at age of 20, when he left New York University.

Professional background

Banking business
Segal became interested in banking and real-estate early in his career. He worked for several banks in New York and New Jersey. In 1920, Segal moved to California and worked for the Los Angeles Trust & Savings Bank, later called the Pacific Southwest Trust & Savings Bank and was then assigned to their Glendale branch as an escrow clerk. He then went to Visalia, California as accountant and auditor with the Central Counties Gas Company.

In 1922, he moved to Monterey, where he worked for the Bank of Monterey. He later was employed in the First National Bank of Monterey. He then moved to Carmel-by-the-Sea and purchased a home on Monte Verde Street. He also owned  in Palo Colorado Canyon, California.

Bank of Carmel

In 1923 he helped organized the Bank of Carmel and secured the State bank charter. The Bank of Carmel opened on July 15, 1923, in a building between Mission and Dolores Streets in Carmel-by-the-Sea. Businessman Thomas Albert Work (1870-1963), of Pacific Grove, was elected president of the bank. The directors of the bank were: T. A. Work, Charles O. Goold, Barnet Segal, Silas V. Mack, and J. A. Sparolini. The Bank of Carmel began with capital stock of $25,000 and with capitalization of $100,000. Segal worked for the bank for sixteen years. 

The bank outgrew its old building, and in 1938, Segal was instrumental in the bank's move in 1939, to a new two-story concrete building for the Bank of Carmel, at the corner of Ocean Avenue and Delores Street. 

It was Carmel's first commercial bank and the only 1930s Art Deco style building in Carmel. Segal sold controlling interest in the bank to T.A. Work in 1928. During the Great Depression in the United States he sold real estate and insurance.

Carmel Art Association

Segal was an early founder of the Carmel Art Association at the time when it did not have their own gallery. 

In 1933, he became treasurer of the association and loaned it $5,500 to secure a deed to purchase the studio of artist and playwright Ira Mallory Remsen (1876-1928). This studio became their new gallery and present location on north Dolores Street, a block and a half from Ocean Avenue. The Segal Gallery, at the Carmel Art Association, honors his generous loan with his name.

Carmel Investment Company

On October 15, 1936, Segal purchased the Carmel Investment Company on Ocean Avenue and San Carlos Street, from Donald Hale. It was one of Carmel's oldest real estate and insurance businesses. It was originally established by Leonard Perry from attorney, theatrical producer Edward G. Kuster.

In 1935 Segal helped with a bond issued by the city for $12,000, with a pledge from the Works Progress Administration (WPA) to add another $9,046 to fund the build a new Carmel Fire Station.

In July 1940, Segal moved his Carmel Investment Company into the old Carmel Bank building on Mission and Dolores Streets. It later became the second location of Wells Books Store, owned by writer Henry Meade Williams.

During World War II, Segal joined the Salinas Army Air Corps. After the war he retruned to real estate and insurance business.

Carmel Savings and Loan Association
In 1940, he founded the Carmel Savings and Loan Association, which was at the southeast corner of Dolores Street and 7th Avenue.  

On April 3, 1957, Robert A. Norton sold the Pacfic Telephone and Telegraph Company company building for $100,000 to Segal for the new location of the Carmel Savings and Loan Association. The Pacific Bell building was originally built by Percy Parkes for Mary Louise Pearce (1870-1952) was one Carmel's' first residents at a cost of $8,000 to house the office of the Pacific Telephone and Telegraph Company.

In January 1971, The Carmel Savings and Loan Association merged with the Palo Alto Salinas Savings and Loan. As a result of the merge, Segal sold his interest to the Palo Alto Salinas Savings and Loan, which was later bought by the Great Western Bank. The building's sale gave him 250,000 shares of bank's stock.

He served as City Treasurer in Carmel from 1928 to 1936 and as a County Water Commissioner. He was a founding member of the Pacheco Club in Monterey; a charter member of the American Legion Post No. 512 in Carmel and the Monterey Post No. 41; and of the Carmel Lodge 680 of the Masonic Order; and was a charter member of the Carmel Kiwanis. He was a member of the High 12 Club of Carmel; a member of Sons In Retirement; a retired honorary member of The Salvation Army; a 25 year member of the Monterey Elks Club Lodge No. 1285 and Elks Lodge No. 1298, of Visalia; a charter member of the Rancho Canada Golf Club; and a member of the Scottish Rite bodies of San Jose.

Death

Segal died on September 6, 1985, at Community Hospital of the Monterey Peninsula in Monterey, California, at the age of 87. A memorial service took place on September 24th at the Salvation Army building in Seaside, California. He was cremated at The Paul Mortuary funeral home in Pacific Grove, California.

Legacy

Segal setup the Barnet J. Segal Charitable Trust to distribute his estate for the benefit of Monterey County, California. Dr. Herbert and Elaine Berman of Carmel, executors of the trust, gave a $300,000 donation to the Carmel Public Library Foundation. The Barnet J. Segal Reading Room at the Harrison Memorial Library honors him and was dedicated with a special event on June 4, 1995. The room includes a large window with a view of the garden and seating for 18 is available around three tables. There is also a table and chairs in front of a fireplace. Above the fireplace is a sign that says: "Barnet Segal Reading Room."

The Trust has since donated to the Natividad Medical Foundation, the Carmel Foundation low-income senior housing project, the Monterey Sports Center, as well as other causes.

See also
Timeline of Carmel-by-the-Sea, California

References

External links
William Brodsley interview

1898 births
1985 deaths
People from California
People from New York City